The 2nd West Essex CC Formula 2 Race was a Formula Two motor race held on 27 June 1953 at Snetterton Circuit, Norfolk. The race was run over 10 laps of the circuit, and was won by British driver Kenneth McAlpine in a Connaught Type A-Lea Francis. McAlpine's teammate John Coombs was second and Rodney Nuckey in a Cooper T23-Bristol was third. Roy Salvadori in another Connaught set fastest lap but retired on the last lap with engine failure.

Results

References

West Essex CC Formula 2 Race
West Essex CC Formula 2 Race
West Essex CC Formula 2 Race